The First Hierarch of the Russian Orthodox Church Outside of Russia, or Russian Orthodox Church Abroad, is the primate of the Russian Orthodox Church Outside Russia, a semi-autonomous Church under the Moscow Patriarchate.

The position of First Hierarch is currently occupied by Nicholas (Olhovsky). The see of the First Hierarch is currently the Russian Orthodox Eparchy of Eastern America and New York.

List of holders 

 Antony (Khrapovitsky) (1920–1936)
 Anastasius (Gribanovsky) (1936–1964)
 Philaret (Voznesensky) (1964–1985)
 Vitaly (Ustinov) (1986–2001)
 Laurus (Škurla) (2001–2008)
 Hilarion (Kapral) (2008–2022)
 Nicholas (Olhovsky) (2022-incumbent)

References 

Russian Orthodox Church
Russian Orthodox Church Outside of Russia